Class 85 may refer to:

British Rail Class 85 – a class of British electric locomotives
DRG Class 85 – a class of German standard 2–10–2T steam locomotives